Khun Tan railway station is a railway station on the Northern Line located in Lamphun Province, Thailand. Khun Tan Railway Station is in the Tha Pladuk Subdistrict, Mae Tha District.

Around the railway station is the entrance Doi Khuntan National Park, which has bungalows run by the State Railway of Thailand, for visitors' use as well.

Khun Tan Tunnel 

Two hundred metres south of Khun Tan Railway Station is the Khun Tan Tunnel. Construction took 11 years at a cost of 1.3 million baht. It was finished in 1918.

Train services 
 Special Express Diesel Car No. 7/8 Bangkok- Chiang Mai- Bangkok
 Special Express "Uttrawithi" 9/10 Bangkok-Chiang Mai-Bangkok
 Special Express 13/14 Bangkok-Chiang Mai-Bangkok
 Express 51/52 Bangkok-Chiang Mai-Bangkok
 Rapid 109/102 Bangkok-Chiang Mai-Bangkok
 Local 407/408 Nakhon Sawan-Chiang Mai-Nakhon Sawan

References 

 
 
 

Railway stations in Thailand
Buildings and structures in Lamphun province